Ch'osan County is a kun, or county, in Chagang province, North Korea.  It borders the People's Republic of China to the north.

The terrain slopes downward from the Kangnam Mountains in the south to the Yalu River in the north. The highest peak is Namhaetaesan (남해태산, 1,079 m).  Some 20% of the land is arable, with animal husbandry and beekeeping playing important roles.  76.1% of the land is forested, and thus logging also contributes to the local economy.

The climate is continental, with hot summers and cold winters. The highest temperature recorded in North Korea, 41 °C, was recorded in the county in July 1961.

During the Korean War on October 26, 1950, Republic of Korea forces reached the Yalu River at Chosan, shortly before the massive Chinese counterattack.

The Chosan Revolutionary Site is associated with Kim Hyong-jik. He visited Chosan several times and met with members of the Korean National Association. The site includes the Paesin School.

In 1999, a complex of Koguryo tombs was excavated in Chosan.

Administrative divisions
Ch'osan County is divided into 1 ŭp (town) and 18 ri (villages):

See also
Geography of North Korea
Administrative divisions of North Korea

References

External links

Counties of Chagang